The David Van Gelder Octagon House, also known as Springside is located at 21 Walnut Street in Catskill, New York.  The brick house was built in 1860. It is architecturally significant as an example of an octagon house.  The eight-sided plan was made popular in the mid-19th century  by phrenologist Orson Squire Fowler.  He called the floor plan "a superior plan".  It includes four large square rooms and four small triangular rooms on each of the two floors.  Two corners of each of the triangular rooms are small triangular closets.  A central stair rises through the house to the cupola on the roof.  A kitchen wing was added, likely in the mid-1870s.

It was listed on the National Register of Historic Places in 1998.

See also
Octagon house

References

External links

Houses on the National Register of Historic Places in New York (state)
Octagon houses in New York (state)
Houses completed in 1860
Houses in Greene County, New York
National Register of Historic Places in Greene County, New York
Catskill, New York